Nearchus or Nearch (also written Neärchus or Neärch) was a third-century AD Armenian martyr and saint.  He was a Roman army officer and friend of Polyeuctus, whom he had converted to the Christian faith. Nearchus was later burned alive.   His feast day is on April 22.

Saints Nearchus and Polyeuctus 
Saints Nearchus and Polyeuctus were third-century Roman army officers in Armenia. Their saints’ story is told in Menalogion of Metaphrastes. Nearchus was Christian, but Polyeuctus was not. The men had a strong desire to spend eternity together, so Polyeuctus converted from paganism to Christianity. With a convert’s zeal he attacked a pagan procession. He was beheaded for his crime. Shortly before he was executed, he spoke his last words to Nearchus: “Remember our secret vow.” Nearchus was later burned alive.

References 

3rd-century Christian martyrs
Military saints
Year of birth unknown